Chishi is a Sümi Naga surname. Notable people with the surname include:

 Isak Chishi Swu, chairman of the Nationalist Socialist Council of Nagaland (NSCN)
 K. L. Chishi (born 1944), Indian politician
 Nagaho Chishi (born 1997), Indian cricketer
 Toni Chishi (born 1995), Indian cricketer

Surnames of Naga origin
Naga-language surnames